Hilal bin Hamad bin Mohammed Al Sarmi (born 15 February 1978) is an Omani politician who has been a Member of the Consultative Assembly of Oman for the wilayat of Seeb since the 2015 Omani general election. He is Chairman of the Health and Environmental Committee.

He graduated with a Masters in International Trade and Diplomacy from the University of East Anglia.

References

1978 births
Living people
Alumni of the University of East Anglia
Members of the Consultative Assembly (Oman)
Omani politicians